The 2021 Oakville Fall Classic was held from August 27 to 29 at the Oakville Curling Club in Oakville, Ontario. It was the fourth men's event and third women's event of the 2021–22 curling season. The total purse for the event was $6,000 on the men's side and $3,800 on the women's sides.

Team Glenn Howard won the men's event, defeating Team Jonathan Beuk (skipped by Tanner Horgan) 6–2 in the final. The game only lasted four ends, with Howard scoring four in the first and two in the third while Beuk could only generate singles in both the second and fourth ends. Down 6–2 without hammer, they conceded. To reach the final, Howard trounced Team Jordan McNamara 9–1 in the quarterfinals and then beat Team Pat Ferris 5–2 in the semifinals. Team Beuk also came through the quarterfinals, defeating Team Rob Ainsley 9–2 and then the previously undefeated Team Mark Kean 6–5 in an extra end semifinal. Team Howard received $2,000 for their win, with Beuk receiving $1,500.

On the women's side, Jamie Sinclair and her rink from the Charlotte, North Carolina defeated the Suzanne Birt rink from Charlottetown, Prince Edward Island 8–6 to claim the title. After trailing 3–0 early, Team Birt scored two points in the third and stole two in the fourth to lead 4–3 at the break. Sinclair then came back with three of her own in the sixth before Birt leveled the score 6–6 with two points in the seventh. Sinclair then scored two in the eighth to win the tournament and the $1,500 winner's purse. Teams Jacqueline Harrison and Laurie St-Georges also qualified for the playoffs, with Harrison losing to Birt 5–4 in one semifinal and St-Georges dropping their game to Sinclair, also 5–4.

Men

Teams
The teams are listed as follows:

Round robin standings 
Final Round Robin Standings

Round robin results 
All draw times are listed in Eastern Time (UTC−04:00).

Draw 1
Friday, August 27, 5:30 pm

Draw 2
Friday, August 27, 9:30 pm

Draw 3
Saturday, August 28, 10:00 am

Draw 4
Saturday, August 28, 1:30 pm

Draw 5
Saturday, August 28, 5:30 pm

Playoffs

Source:

Quarterfinals
Sunday, August 29, 9:00 am

Semifinals
Sunday, August 29, 12:30 pm

Final
Sunday, August 29, 3:30 pm

Women

Teams
The teams are listed as follows:

Round robin standings 
Final Round Robin Standings

Round robin results 
All draw times are listed in Eastern Time (UTC−04:00).

Draw 1
Friday, August 27, 5:30 pm

Draw 2
Friday, August 27, 9:30 pm

Draw 3
Saturday, August 28, 10:00 am

Draw 4
Saturday, August 28, 1:30 pm

Draw 5
Saturday, August 28, 5:30 pm

Playoffs

Source:

Semifinals
Sunday, August 29, 12:30 pm

Final
Sunday, August 29, 3:30 pm

Notes

References

External links
Men's Event
Women's Event

2021 in Canadian curling
Curling in Ontario
August 2021 sports events in Canada
2021 in Ontario
Oakville, Ontario